Jacqueline Briggs Martin is an American author of children's literature and a teacher of creative writing. Her books have received several awards including, Caldecott Medal (1999), Golden Kite Award, Lupine Award (1996, 1998, 2003), Award for Excellence in Children's Literature from the Sterling North Society, and the Green Earth Award (2018). She has taught at Cornell College, University of Iowa, The Loft Literary Center, and is on faculty at Hamline University.

Martin spent her early life on a dairy farm in Maine. She currently lives in Mount Vernon, Iowa.

Selected works

 Creekfinding: A True Story
 Chef Roy Choi and the Street Food Remix
 Alice Waters and the Trip to Delicious
 Farmer Will Allen and the Growing Table
 The Chiru of High Tibet
 Chicken Joy on Redbean Road
 Banjo Granny
 On Sand Island
 The Finest Horse in Town
 The Water Gift and The Pig of the Pig
 The Lamp, the Ice, and the Boat Called Fish: Based on a True Story
 Snowflake Bentley
 Grandmother Bryant's Pocket
 Good Times on Grandfather Mountain
 Button, Bucket, Sky
 Chef Roy Choi and the Street Food Re-mix

References

External links 
 Official website
 

21st-century American writers
21st-century American women writers
Living people
Year of birth missing (living people)
American children's writers
Writers from Maine
Writers from Iowa
People from Mount Vernon, Iowa
Hamline University faculty
American women children's writers
American women academics